Peggie Castle (December 22, 1927 – August 11, 1973) was an American actress who specialized in playing the "other woman" in B-movies. Castle was Miss Cheesecake in 1949.

Early life
Castle was born as Peggy Thomas Blair in Appalachia, Wise County, Virginia. She changed her last name "because there was another actress named Blair at the first studio in which she worked." Her father, Doyle H. Blair, was at one point "an industrial relations director for a large corporation" and later business manager for Donald O'Connor and studio manager for Goldwyn Studios. Her mother was Elizabeth Blair. She took lessons in drama when she was 8 years old.

Castle graduated from Hollywood High School and  attended Mills College for two years.

Career

Radio
Castle's first work as an actress came in the soap opera Today's Children. Then, a spot on Lux Radio Theatre in 1947 brought her a screen test offer from 20th Century Fox.

Film
Castle was discovered by a talent scout while eating in a restaurant in Beverly Hills. She was signed to a seven-year contract with Universal-International and made her film debut in the 1947 film When a Girl's Beautiful. In 1949, she was named "Miss Cheesecake" by the Southern California Restaurant Association. Later that year, the Junior Chamber of Commerce named Castle "Miss Three Alarm". She later appeared in the films Mr. Belvedere Goes to College (1949), Payment on Demand (1951), The Prince Who Was a Thief (1951) Invasion, U.S.A. (1952), 99 River Street (1953), Beginning of the End (1957), and Arrivederci Roma (1957). She often starred in Westerns, appearing in nearly a dozen between Wagons West (1952) and Hell's Crossroads (1957).

Television
In the 1950s, Castle moved into television. She appeared in multiple guest roles on Fireside Theater, Cheyenne, 77 Sunset Strip, and The Restless Gun. In 1957, she appeared as Amy Gordon on Cheyenne in the episode titled "The Spanish Grant". In 1957, she played defendant Sally Fenner in the Perry Mason episode, "The Case of the Negligent Nymph".  Also in 1957, she was a primary star on Gunsmoke, playing a forlorn Nita Tucker in the episode "Chester's Murder". 

From 1959 to 1962, she co-starred in the television Western series Lawman — her first continuing series. Her role as saloon owner Lily Merrill brought out a new dimension of Castle's talent. She stated, "For the first time in my life, I'm a singer — that's the producer's opinion, not mine."

Her final onscreen role was a guest appearance in a 1966 episode of The Virginian.

Stage
In 1958, Castle acted with Jesse White in a production of A Hole in the Head at the Civic Playhouse in Los Angeles.

Personal appearances
In 1960, Castle and Peter Brown (who also was a regular in Lawman) traveled to rodeos, performing as a song-and-dance team. Castle stressed, "We're very careful not to sing any romantic songs," treating the act more like a brother-sister team. The duo's stops included St. Louis, Chicago, Detroit, Pittsburgh, and Albuquerque.

Awards 
 1960 Hollywood Walk of Fame. 
6230 Hollywood Boulevard. Dedicated February 8, 1960.

Personal life
Castle was married four times. She married Revis T. Call, a second lieutenant in the Army, on August 19, 1945, in Los Angeles. Following that marriage, she began using Peggy Call as her professional name. They divorced in 1950. She married Universal publicist Robert H. Raines on January 4, 1951. They divorced April 29, 1954.

On July 24, 1955, Castle married William McGarry, producer and director. They had a daughter, Erin McGarry. Castle divorced McGarry in 1969.

In 1971, Castle married Arthur Morganstern, her fourth husband. They remained married until Morganstern's death in April 1973.

Death
Castle was an alcoholic. On August 11, 1973, her third husband, William McGarry, found her body on the couch of her Hollywood apartment. Her death was later determined to be caused by cirrhosis.

Filmography 
This is a partial list of films.

Films

Television

References

External links

 
 
 The Girl They Loved to Kill

1927 births
1973 deaths
20th-century American actresses
Actresses from Hollywood, Los Angeles
Actresses from Virginia
Alcohol-related deaths in California
American film actresses
American radio actresses
American television actresses
Deaths from cirrhosis
People from Appalachia, Virginia
People from Hollywood, Los Angeles
Western (genre) film actresses
Warner Bros. contract players
Western (genre) television actors